The Uzbekistani records in swimming are the fastest ever performances of swimmers from Uzbekistan, which are recognised and ratified by the Uzbekistan Swimming Federation.

All records were set in finals unless noted otherwise.

Long Course (50 m)

Men

Women

Mixed relay

Short Course (25 m)

Men

Women

References

External links
Uzbekistan Swimming Federation website

Uzbekistan
Records
Swimming
Swimming